Zalux can refer to:
Zalux, a lighting manufacturer in Spain, a subsidiary of Trilux
a trade name of Modafinil, a medication to treat sleepiness